Bids were due by 28 November 2013, the candidates cities were selected on 5 December 2014 and Lausanne was elected host city on 31 July 2015.

Votes results

Bidding calendar
2013
6 June: IOC Invites NOCs to submit applications for 2020 Winter Youth Olympics 
28 November: Deadline to Submit Bids to IOC
12 December: Signature of YOG Candidature Procedure
2014
14-16 January: IOC Workshop for 2020 YOG Applicant Cities in Lausanne
17 June: Submission of YOG Application Files
16-28 August: Observer Program at 2014 Summer Youth Olympics in Nanjing
5 December: Candidates Cities Two Cities in Lausanne
2015
June 2015: Video conferences between Candidate Cities and IOC Evaluation Commission
31 July: Election of the host city. Lausanne received 71 votes out of 81.

Candidates cities

Two cities have submitted their application to the International Olympic Committee by the 28 November 2013 deadline.

Lausanne, Switzerland

Lausanne confirmed their bid for the 2020 Winter Youth Olympics on 12 July 2013. Lausanne is where the International Olympic Committee is headquartered and is considered to be the Olympic capital. On 12 December 2013, Lausanne was signed Youth Olympic Game Candidature Procedure.

Brașov, Romania

Brașov has officially submitted their bid for the 2020 Winter Youth Olympics in November 2013.  In early 2013, Brașov hosted the 2013 European Youth Olympic Winter Festival. On 12 December 2013, Brașov was signed Youth Olympic Game Candidature Procedure.

Other cities which had considered a bid

Europe

 Sofia, Bulgaria

Sofia bid to host the 1992 and 1994 Winter Olympics, but lost to Albertville and Lillehammer respectively. Sofia was going to bid for the 2016 Winter Youth Olympics but did not submit a bid citing that they did not fill the requirements set by the IOC. The Bulgarian Olympic Committee is interested in the city potentially bidding for the 2020 Winter Youth Olympics.

North America

 Lake Placid, United States

Lake Placid hosted the 1932 and 1980 Winter Olympics. Lake Placid was interested in bidding for the 2016 Winter Youth Olympics but opted to bid for 2020 instead. Lake Placid hosted the sixth IOC Athlete Career Program Forum on 8–11 November 2012.

References

External links
 Brasov 2020
 Brasov 2020 Facebook Page
 Lausanne 2020 

 
Bids
2020